Russell Hall may refer to:

 Russell Hall (Georgia)
Russ Hall, baseball player
Russell Hall (Lock Haven)

See also
Russell Town Hall
Walter Russell Hall
Russells Hall